Raffles (also known as Players in the United States; now Virginia S by Raffles) was a British brand of cigarettes which was owned and manufactured by Philip Morris USA in the U.S. and by Philip Morris International outside of the U.S.

History
In August 2001, Imperial Tobacco announced that it had entered into an agreement with Philip Morris International for the distribution and sale of Marlboro, Raffles and Chesterfield cigarettes in the U.K.

In May 2011, the nme of the brand was changed from Raffles to Virginia S by Raffles. Philip Morris Marketing Director Xavier Ducarroz described the rename as a move to a "contemporary look and feel."

Advertising
Various poster and magazine adverts, as well as promotional merchandise, were made to promote the brand in the 1980s and 1990s.

See also
 Tobacco smoking

References

Philip Morris brands